Mánička (in plural: máničky) is a Czech term used for young people with long hair, typically men, in Czechoslovakia through the 1960s and 1970s. Long hair for males during this time was considered an expression of political and social attitudes in communist Czechoslovakia.

Background 
Long hair was associated with the subcultures and youth movements that arose in the Western world during the mid-1960s, such as Hippies and rock music. Following the February coup d'état of 1948, the new communist régime condemned some elements of the Western culture as an inherently decadent imperialist "import" into the socialist world. At first, communists persecuted sympathizers of rock 'n' roll and bebop, and later they focused on supporters of rock music. Their methods were compared with the campaigns of Nazi régime against the supporters of jazz and swing during the Protectorate of Bohemia and Moravia. The term "máničky" is also generally associated with the generation gap that increased around the world during the 1960s.

Male long hair in the Czechoslovak society of the 1960s and 1970s was partially regarded as a matter of image and style, but the main reason for having long hair was usually different. The young people attempted to express openly their political attitude, independence, freedom and protest. However, the revolt symbolized by extravagant appearance was not tolerated by communists and young rebels were often forced to cut their hair. From the mid-1960s, "máničky" became a target of continuous interest of the state security apparatus. The activities of the alternative youth culture were not only and primarily political; therefore it was difficult for communists to grasp their intentions. A large number of young people attempting to live outside of the influence and control of the state was disturbing for the regime, as these people represented a potential danger for the communist system. Through the coordinated pressure of various levels of the state administration, the totalitarian power attempted to force young people to change their appearance, or to displace from the public sphere people who were not "socially acceptable".

Persecution 
From the mid-1960s, the long-haired and "untidy" persons (so called "máničky" or "vlasatci" (in English: Mops)) were banned from entering pubs, cinema halls, theatres and using public transportation in several Czech cities and towns. In 1964, the public transportation regulations in Most and Litvínov excluded long-haired "máničky" as displeasure-evoking persons. Two years later, the municipal council in Poděbrady banned "máničky" from entering cultural institutions in the town. In August 1966, Rudé právo informed that "máničky" in Prague were banned from visiting restaurants of the I. and II. price category.

In 1966, during a big campaign coordinated by the Communist Party of Czechoslovakia, around 4,000 young males were forced to cut their hair, often in the cells with the assistance of the state police. On 19 August 1966, during a "safety intervention" organized by the state police, 140 long-haired people were arrested. As a response, the "community of long-haired" organized a protest in Prague. More than 100 people cheered slogans such as "Give us back our hair!" or "Away with hairdressers!". The state police arrested the organizers and several participants of the meeting. Some of them were given prison sentences. According to the newspaper Mladá fronta Dnes, the Czechoslovak Ministry of Interior in 1966 even compiled a detailed map of the frequency of occurrence of long-haired males in Czechoslovakia.

In August, 1969, during the first anniversary of the Soviet occupation of Czechoslovakia, the long-haired youth were one of the most active voices in the state protesting against the occupation. Youth protesters have been labeled as "vagabonds" and "slackers" by the official normalized press.

The discriminatory campaign against long-haired males called "Máš-li dlouhý vlas, nechoď mezi nás!" (If you have long hair, do not walk among us!) was supported by the state television, and major newspapers and magazines. The campaign consisted of a series of TV spots showing detection and conviction of a long-haired person in a public place. Each spot ended with the trademark slogan: "If you have long hair, do not walk among us!" Similarly, an episode of the popular propagandistic TV series Thirty Cases of Major Zeman showed "máničky" as a harmful, criminal and drug-using social element. Long-haired and intoxicated individuals in the episode called "Mimikry" (Mimicry, 1972) smuggle drugs with suspicious dealers from the Western imperialist world, they cause the death of a girl, and finally they attempt to flee to the West with a hijacked plane.

The performances of the Czech underground bands The Plastic People of the Universe and DG 307 were regularly visited by the long-haired "máničky". In 1974, a concert of The Plastic People of the Universe in České Budějovice was broken up by police. The participants were brought to hearings and trials and forced to cut their hair. Many of them were harassed and some of them were fired from their jobs. In 1976, during a politicized trial with the members of the Plastic People, máničky publicly supported the accused artists.

The repression against long-haired people by the socialist system continued up to 1989, though in a moderate form. The Velvet Revolution and subsequent transformation of the Czechoslovak society into a democratic system caused significant changes, and long hair as a manifestation of defiance has gradually lost the previous meaning of a "protest" act.

"Máničky" have been supported by numerous personalities of the public life in Czechoslovakia: former Czech President Václav Havel, poet Ivan Martin Jirous, musician Milan Hlavsa and politician Alexandr Vondra among others.

See also 
 Husák's Children
 Prague underground
 Potápky
 Beard and haircut laws by country

Notes

References 
 

Czech youth culture
Czechoslovak Socialist Republic
Counterculture of the 1960s